The 2011–12 Austrian Football First League was the 38th season of the Austrian second-level football league. It began on 10 June 2011 and ended on 18 May 2012 after the 36th and final round. The Carinthian cooperative associations Wolfsberger AC and SK St. Andrä won the championship.  WAC, which ended its cooperative with SK St. Andrä after the 2011–12 season, moved up to the Bundesliga for the first time.  The last place team of TSV Hartberg had to move down to the Austrian Regional League Central.  The second-to-last place team had to play two relegation matches against Grazer AK, the champion of the Central Regional League.

Overview 

The First League is the second-highest league in Austrian professional soccer and held its 36th season in 2011–12.  LASK Linz was new in the league as well as the two winners of the relegation matches (ninth place in the First League 2010–11 against the champion of the Regional League East 2010–11 and the champion of the Regional League West 2010–11 against the champion of the Regional League Central 2010-11).

In the 2011–12 season, Vorarlberg had three clubs, Upper Austria had two clubs, and Vienna, Lower Austria, Salzburg, Styria, and Carinthia each had one club.  Burgenland and Tyrol were not represented in the First League.

sky Deutschland owned the television rights for the First League as in the Bundesliga which allowed them to show every game in full length.  The games were broadcast on sky sport austria and as part of a conference circuit with four games beginning at 6:30PM.  In the last two rounds, all games had to be played at the same time, and sky was allowed to pick an additional game which would be designated as the "Top Game of the Round" and would be shown at 8:30PM on Fridays.  ORF also had the rights to broadcast the Top Game of the Round live and in full length.  They broadcast the games on their channel ORF Sport +.

Method
In the 2011–12 season, which began on 10 July 2011, ten clubs competed against each other in 36 rounds, as had been done in previous seasons.  The championship ended on 13 May 2012.

The champion of the league moved up to the Bundesliga.  The last place team had to move down to its corresponding region in the Regional League.  This team was replaced by the winner of the two qualification matches between the champions of the Regional League West and Regional League East.  The next-to-last team had to play two relegation matches against the champion of the Regional League Central.  The winner of the relegation matches qualified for the First League for the 2012–13 season.

League table

Results

Goal scoring statistics

Cities, venues, and attendance

The champions WAC/St. Andrä

Promotion/relegation playoffs
In the new class reform of 2009, it was decided that the promotion candidates of the Regional Leagues together with the ninth place in the First League must compete in the relegation matches in order to remain in or be promoted to the First League.  An alternating method of relegation matches was agreed upon for the Regional League teams.  Accordingly, the Regional League Central had to compete against the ninth place in the First League and the Regional League East had to compete against the Regional League West in this season. On the basis of the license withdrawal of LASK Linz and the associated demotion to the Regional League Central, the ninth place in the First League, FC Lustenau 07, remained in the second level of play without a relegation match.  The last place in the First League, TSV Hartberg, moved up to the relegation place and competed against the Regional League Central champion.

In the first pairing, the last place in the First League, TSV Hartberg, played against the champion of the Regional League central, Grazer AK.

In the second pairing, the champion of the Regional League East, SV Horn, played against the Regional League West champion WSG Swarovski Wattens.

See also
 2011–12 Austrian Football Bundesliga
 2011–12 Austrian Cup

References

External links
 Official site
 soccerway.com

Austria 2
First League
2011